Dromm is a surname. Notable people with the surname include:

Andrea Dromm (born 1941), American actress
Daniel Dromm (born 1955), American politician